Up Jumped Spring is an album by trombonist Curtis Fuller recorded in 2003 and released by the Delmark label the following year.

Reception

Alex Henderson of Allmusic said "a strong Jazz Messengers influence asserts itself on these hard bop and post-bop performances ... the trombonist is in fine form throughout the album -- he never fails to sound inspired and focused -- and Up Jumped Spring is a welcome addition to his catalog". In JazzTimes Doug Ramsey wrote "Following illness and the loss of a lung, Curtis Fuller has a trombone sound that’s a bit wooly. But it’s still round and full, and his breath control, speed and agility are intact-and his imagination still flourishes. ... With a solid Chicago rhythm section, Fuller and trumpeter Brad Goode make music the old-fashioned way, with compact improvisations on familiar tunes rather than extended explorations of original material. Their front-line work is a study in sonic contrast, Goode’s penetrating sound against Fuller’s enveloping suppleness". On All About Jazz Terrell Kent Holmes noted "The timeless Curtis Fuller has been a brand name trombone player for about 50 years now and he's never sounded better than he does ... not only does he still have strong chops but he can bring a fresh perspective to classics and originals"

Track listing 
 "Cantaloupe Island" (Herbie Hancock) – 5:47
 "Up Jumped Spring" (Freddie Hubbard) – 6:29
 "In a Mellow Tone" (Duke Ellington, Milt Gabler) – 5:44
 "God Bless the Child" (Billie Holiday, Arthur Herzog Jr.) – 6:15
 "Bags' Groove" (Milt Jackson) – 4:11
 "Equinox" (John Coltrane) – 5:40
 "I'm Old Fashioned" (Jerome Kern, Johnny Mercer) – 5:11
 "Alone Together" (Arthur Schwartz, Howard Dietz) – 4:52	
 "Whisper Not" (Benny Golson) – 2:57
 "Black Night" (Jessie Mae Robinson) – 6:08
 "Star Eyes" (Gene de Paul, Don Raye) – 7:51

Personnel 
Curtis Fuller – trombone
Brad Goode – trumpet
Karl Montzka - piano
Larry Gray (tracks 1-3 & 9), Stewart Miller (tracks 5-8, 10 & 11) – bass
Tim Davis - drums
Jacey Falk – vocals (track 10)

References 

2005 albums
Delmark Records albums
Curtis Fuller albums
Albums produced by Bob Koester